This is a list of dams and water reservoirs in Canada.

Alberta

Bassano Dam
Bearspaw Dam
Bighorn Dam
Brazeau Dam
Cascade Dam
Dickson Dam
Ghost Dam
Glenmore Reservoir
Interlakes Dam
Milk River Ridge Reservoir
Old Man River Dam
Three Sisters Dam
Coal Lake Dam
Lajoie Dam (Downton Lake)
Wahleach Dam a.k.a. Jones Lake Dam (Wahleach Lake a.k.a. Jones Lake)

British Columbia 

Brilliant Dam
Buntzen Lake Dam (Buntzen Lake)
Cleveland Dam (Capilano Lake)
Clowhom Dam (Clowhom Lake)
Comox Lake Dam, Puntledge River
Corra Linn Dam (Kootenay Lake)
Coquitlam Dam (Coquitlam Lake)
Daisy Lake Dam (Daisy Lake)
Duncan Dam (Duncan Lake)
Horseshoe Dam
Elk Falls Dam (Elk River)
John Hart Dam
Jordan River Diversion Dam
Hugh Keenleyside Dam (Arrow Lakes)
Kenney Dam (Nechako Reservoir)
Lower Bonnington Dam
Mica Dam (Kinbasket Lake)
Ocean Falls Dam
Peace Canyon Dam
Powell River Dam (Powell Lake)
Revelstoke Dam (Lake Revelstoke)
Ruskin Dam (Hayward Lake)
Seton Canal (a.k.a. Lillooet Canal)
Seton Dam (Seton Lake)
Seven Mile Dam
Seymour Dam (Seymour River)
 Seymour Falls Dam (Seymour River)
South Slocan Dam
Spillimacheen Dam
Stave Falls Dam (Stave Lake)
Terzaghi Dam a.k.a. Mission Dam (Carpenter Lake)
Theodosia Dam
Upper Bonnington Dam
W. A. C. Bennett Dam (Lake Williston)
Waneta Dam
Whatshan Dam

Manitoba

Nelson River and Churchill Diversion
Jenpeg Dam
Kettle Dam
Limestone Dam
Long Spruce Dam
Grand Rapids Dam
Great Falls Dam (Manitoba)
Laurie River I Dam
Laurie River II Dam
McArthur Dam
Pine Falls Dam
Seven Sisters Dam
Pointe du Bois Dam
Slave Falls Dam

New Brunswick

Beechwood Dam
Grand Falls Generating Station
Mactaquac Dam
Tinker Dam
Tobique Narrows Dam
Milltown Generation Station

Newfoundland and Labrador

Smallwood Reservoir, Churchill Falls generating station, largest capacity in North America (5,428 MW installed, expandable to 9,252 MW); the world's second-largest reservoir. 
Ossokmanuan Reservoir, Twin Falls generating station (diverted to Churchill Falls)
Cat Arm Reservoir, Cat Arm Hydroelectric Generating Station
Star Lake, Star Lake generating station
Hinds Lake, Hinds Lake Hydroelectric Generating Station
Deer Lake, Deer Lake generating station
Paradise River Dam, Paradise River Hydroelectric Generating Station (the largest concrete arch dam in Eastern North America)
Grand Falls Dam, Exploits River generating station
Bishops Falls Dam, Bishops Falls generating station

Ontario

Large hydroelectric

 Decew Falls 2 (Twelve Mile Creek)
 Ontario Power (retired) (Niagara River)
 Sir Adam Beck 1 (Niagara River)
 Sir Adam Beck 2 (Niagara River)
 Sir Adam Beck Pump-Generating Station (Niagara River) upgrade complete 
 Abitibi Canyon Generating Station (Abitibi River)
 Harmon (Mattagami River)
 Hound Chute (Montreal River)
 Indian Chute (Montreal River)
 Kipling (Mattagami River)
 Little Long (Mattagami River)
 Lower Notch (Montreal River)
 Lower Sturgeon Falls (Mattagami River)
 Matabitchuan (Montreal River)
 Otter Rapids Generating Station (Abitibi River)
 Sandy Falls (Mattagami River)
 Smoky Falls (Mattagami River)
 Wawaitin Falls (Mattagami River)
 Aguasabon (Aguasabon River)
 Alexander Falls (Nipigon River)
 Cameron Falls (Nipigon River)
 Caribou Falls (English River)
 Ear Falls (English River)
 Kakabeka Falls (Kaministiquia River)
 Manitou Falls (English River)
 Pine Portage (Nipigon River)
 Silver Falls (Dog River)
 Whitedog Falls (Winnipeg River)
 Arnprior (Madawaska River)
 Barrett Chute (Madawaska River)
 Calabogie (Madawaska River)
 Chats Falls Dam (Ottawa River)
 Chenaux Station (Ottawa River)
 Des Joachims (Ottawa River)
 Mountain Chute (Madawaska River)
 Otto Holden (Ottawa River)
 R.H. Saunders (St. Lawrence River)
 Stewartville (Madawaska River)
 Baysville Dam, Baysville

Small Hydroelectric
 Auburn (Otanabee River)
 Big Chute (Severn River)
 Big Eddy (Muskoka River)
 Bingham Chute (South River)
 Coniston (Wanapitei River)
 Crystal Falls (Sturgeon River)
 Fanshawe Dam (Thames River)

Non hydroelectric
 Pittock Dam (Thames River)
 Wildwood Dam (Thames River)
 Crooks' Hollow Dam (Spencer Creek, Greensville)
 Claireville Flood Control dam and reservoir, Claireville Conservation Area (Humber River (Toronto)
 G Ross Lord Park Flood Control dam and reservoir, G Lord Ross Park (Don River (Toronto)
 Milne Dam and Reservoir, Milne Park Conservation Area - Markham (Rouge River (Toronto))
 McLeod Dam Green Energy Project (Moira River (Belleville))
 Orangeville Reservoir, Orangeville, Ontario - 332 acres lake is at the headwaters of the Credit River and Nottawasaga River

Planned Upgrades or Projects
 Umbata Falls Hydroelectric Project - Installed capacity of 23MW Q2 2008. This project in progress is a partnership of the Pic River First Nation and Innergex II Income Fund (on the White River, near Marathon).
 Island Falls Hydroelectric Project - Installed capacity of 20 mW Q4 2009. Canadian Hydro Developers Inc. Location: Smooth Rock Falls.
 Glen Miller Hydroelectric Project - Innergex II Income Fund (Trenton).

Hydroelectric generation under development
 Little Long, Harmon, Kipling and Smoky Falls - 450MW
 Lower Sturgeon, Sandy Falls and Wawaitin -  16MW
 Mattagami Lake Dam - 5MW

Quebec

Water-resource system Aux-Outardes
Outardes-2 Generating Station
Outardes-3 Generating Station
Outardes-4 Generating Station
Water-resource system Bersimis
Pipmuacan Reservoir
Bersimis-1 Generating Station
Bersimis-2 generating station
Water-resource system Gatineau and Lower Outaouais
Baskatong Reservoir
Bryson Generating Station
Cabonga Reservoir
Carillon Generating Station
Chelsea Generating Station
Chute-des-Chats
Hull-2
Paugan
Rapides-Farmers
Rivière-des-Prairies Generating Station
Water-resource system La Grande Rivière
La Grande-1 generating station
Robert-Bourassa Reservoir
Robert-Bourassa generating station
La Grande-2-A generating station
La Grande-3 generating station
La Grande-4 generating station
Laforge-1 generating station
Laforge-2 generating station
Caniapiscau Reservoir
Brisay generating station
Water-resource system Manicouagan
Hart-Jaune Generating Station
Manic-1 generating station
Manicouagan Reservoir
Jean-Lesage generating station
Manic-3 generating station
Manic-5 generating station
Manic-5-PA generating station
Water-resource system Mitis
Mitis-1 Generating Station
Mitis-2 Generating Station
Water-resource system Upper Outaouais
Bourque Dam and Dozois Reservoir
Première-Chute Generating Station
Rapide-Deux Generating Station
Rapide-Sept Generating Station
Rapides-des-Îles Generating Station
Rapides-des-Quinze Generating Station
Water-resource system Rivière Véco
Lac-Robertson Generating Station
Water-resource system Saint-François
Chute-Hemmings Generating Station
Drummondville Generating Station
Water-resource system St-Lawrence river
Beauharnois Hydroelectric Generating Station
Des Cèdres Generating Station
Water-resource system Saint-Maurice
Beaumont generating station
Gouin Reservoir
Grand-Mère Generating Station
La Gabelle Generating Station
La Tuque Generating Station
Rapide-Blanc Generating Station
Saint-Narcisse Generating Station
Shawinigan-2 Generating Station
Shawinigan-3 Generating Station
Trenche Generating Station

Saskatchewan

Arm Lake Dam (also known as Craik Dam)
Avonlea Dam
Boundary Dam
Blackstrap North Dam
Blackstrap South Dam
Bradwell East Dam
Bradwell West Dam
Brightwater Creek Dam
Broderick East Dam
Broderick West Dam
Buffalo Pound Dam
Candle Lake
Chicken Lake Dam
Cowan Lake Dam
Craven Dam
Darmody Dam
Dellwood Brook Dam
E.B. Campbell Hydroelectric Station
Esterhazy Dam
Five Mile Dam
Francois-Finlay Dam
Gardiner Dam
Grant Devine Dam
Hugonard Dam
Katepwa Dam
Kingsway Dam
Kipahigan Lake Dam
Lac la Plonge Dam
Lac la Ronge Dam
Makwa Lake Control
Moose Mountain Dam
Moosomin Dam
Northminster Effuent Reservoir
Opuntia Lake Control
Pike Lake Water Supply
Qu'Appelle River Dam
Rafferty Dam
Round Lake Dam
Scott Dam
Spruce River Dam
Star City Dam
Stelcan Weir
Summercove Dam
Tee-Pee Creek Dam
Theodore Dam
Wascana Lake Weir
West Poplar Dam
Whitesand Dam
Woody Lake Weir
Zelma Dam

Yukon
Schwatka Lake
Aishihik Lake

See also 
 List of generating stations in Canada

References

External links
 Saskatchewan Dams and Reservoirs

Canada
 
 
Dams and reservoirs
Dams